A civic election was held in Tanzania on Sunday, 14 December 2014.

Results

References

External links
 

Elections in Tanzania
2014 elections in Tanzania
Local elections in Tanzania